Danielle House (born 1976 in Daniel's Harbour, Newfoundland) was crowned Miss Newfoundland in 1995 and Miss Canada International in 1996.  House was stripped of her Miss Canada International title when she was convicted of assaulting her ex-boyfriend's girlfriend in a bar.

Personal life 
House was born in Daniel's Harbour, Newfoundland, Canada. She studied nursing at Memorial University, Newfoundland.

Career 
She was the guest Chicken Cannon shooter on the November 22, 1996 episode of Air Farce.  Later, she achieved greater exposure in a nude pictorial for Playboy magazine's December 1997 issue.  The issue referred to her with the mistaken title "Miss Canada".  However, the last "Miss Canada" was named for 1992. In 2000 she co-starred in the film Solid Cover 2.

See also
List of people of Newfoundland and Labrador

References

External links

Past Title holders for Miss Newfoundland
Profile of Danielle House by Miss Canada International

1976 births
Living people
People from Newfoundland (island)
Canadian people convicted of assault
Memorial University of Newfoundland alumni
Canadian beauty pageant winners